Luka Yehorovych Kyzya (21 February 1912 – 29 December 1974) was a Ukrainian Soviet-era politician, a member of the guerrillas, researcher of the history of the Soviet-German war, Doctor of Sciences, diplomat, Ambassador Extraordinary and Plenipotentiary. Permanent Representative of Ukraine to the United Nations.

Education 
Luka Kyzya graduated from Chernihiv Teachers' Institute (1940) and National Pedagogical Drahomanov University (1948). Doctor of Sciences in History.

Professional career and experience 

In 1941-1943, he was Commissioner of the guerrilla group.

From 1943-1944, he was commander of the guerrilla group.

From 1943-1944, he was Commissioner of the partisan unit.

In 1944, he worked as Secretary for the underground Rivne Regional Committee of the Communist Party of Ukraine.

From 1944-1951, he headed the Republican exhibition "Ukraine as partisans against the Nazi invaders."

From 1951-1956, he was Chairman of the Ukrainian Society for Cultural Relations with foreign countries, Associate Professor Taras Shevchenko National University of Kyiv.

From 1956-1959 - Deputy Minister of Higher and Secondary Specialized Education of the Ukrainian SSR.

From 1959-1960, he was senior researcher at the Institute of History of the Ukrainian SSR.

From 1960-1961, he headed the Department of International Organizations and was a member of the board of the Soviet Foreign Ministry.

On July 29, 1961 and 1964 - he was permanent representative of the Ukrainian Soviet Socialist Republic to the United Nations.

From 1965-1967 - Deputy Minister of Higher and Specialized Secondary Education.

From 1967-1974, he was senior researcher at the Institute of History of the Ukrainian SSR.

Diplomatic rank 
 Ambassador Extraordinary and Plenipotentiary

References

External links 
 Handbook of the history of the Communist Party and the Soviet Union 1898 - 1991
 UNITED NATIONS SECURITY COUNCIL OFFICIAL RECORDS THIRTY-NINTH YEAR 2542nd MEETING: 25 MAY 1984 NEW YORK
 Diplomacy in the Former Soviet Republics James P. Nichol Greenwood Publishing Group, 1.01.1995 - 244.
 Ukraine's U.N. Mission celebrates 40th anniversary

1912 births
1974 deaths
20th-century Ukrainian historians
People from Novgorod-Seversky Uyezd
Communist Party of the Soviet Union members
National Pedagogical Dragomanov University alumni
Permanent Representatives of Ukraine to the United Nations
Academic staff of the Taras Shevchenko National University of Kyiv
Recipients of the Order of Bogdan Khmelnitsky (Soviet Union), 1st class
Recipients of the Order of the Red Banner
Recipients of the Order of the Red Banner of Labour
Soviet historians
Ukrainian historians
Burials at Baikove Cemetery